David Cameron (25 June 1902 – unknown) was a Scottish footballer who played in the Football League for Nottingham Forest.

References

1902 births

Year of death missing
Scottish footballers
Association football defenders
English Football League players
Heart of Midlothian F.C. players
Portsmouth F.C. players
Dunfermline Athletic F.C. players
Nottingham Forest F.C. players
Colwyn Bay F.C. players